The Oregon Golf Association (OGA) Golf Course is a public golf course located in Woodburn, Oregon. The course was rated by Golf Digest in 1996 as a "One of the Top Ten Affordable Courses in the US."

References

Golf clubs and courses in Oregon
Woodburn, Oregon
Tourist attractions in Marion County, Oregon